Nora Cabaltera Villamayor (born May 21, 1953), professionally known as Nora Aunor, is a Filipino actress, recording artist, and film producer. Aunor has also appeared in several stage plays, television shows and concerts. She is known as Philippine cinema's "Superstar" and conferred as Philippine National Artist for Film and Broadcast Arts. The Hollywood Reporter called her "The Grand Dame of Philippine Cinema" for her performance in the movie Taklub (Trap) and her contribution to the Philippine film industry.

Aunor started her career as a singer, after winning a local talent search. She rose to fame in the following years as both a singer and actress. After her film debut All Over the World (1967), she transitioned into heavy drama with highly acclaimed performances in films such as Tatlong Taong Walang Diyos (Three Years Without God) (1976), Minsa'y Isang Gamu-gamo (Once a Moth) (1976), Ina Ka ng Anak Mo (You Are the Mother of Your Daughter) (1979), Himala (Miracle) (1982), Bulaklak sa City Jail (Flowers of the City Jail) (1984), and Bona (1980). In the following decades, her performances in The Flor Contemplacion Story (1995), Thy Womb (2012), and Dementia (2014) gave her further international recognition and numerous international awards and nominations.

For her work, Aunor received 17 FAMAS Award nominations and is a "Hall of Fame" inductee, winning five Best Actress Awards. She is the most nominated actress in the history of the Gawad Urian Awards with 21 nominations, winning seven, and the only performer to be chosen as one of The Best Actors and Actresses of the Decade in three different decades (1980s, 1990s, and 2010s) by the same awards body. She has won eight trophies from PMPC Star Awards for her work in television and movies, as well as eight Metro Manila Film Festival, four Luna Awards, five Young Critics Circle Awards, a Cairo Film Festival award, an Asia Pacific Screen Awards, an Asian Film Awards, among others.

On June 10, 2022, Aunor was conferred as a National Artist for Film and Broadcasting/Broadcast Arts.

Personal life
Nora Aunor was born as Nora Cabaltera Villamayor in Barrio San Francisco, Iriga City, Camarines Sur Province to Antonia Cabaltera and Eustacio Villamayor. She has nine siblings, including Eddie Villamayor, a former actor. When Nora was growing up, her grandmother Lola Theresa taught her to sing; the first song she learned was "The Way of a Clown". Her aunt, Belen Aunor, taught her diction, interpretation, and expression while singing, and gave her her screen name. Before her fame, she lived a poverty stricken childhood and survived by selling peanuts on the buses and cold water in front of the Bicol Express Train Station. She became a champion at the Darigold Jamboree radio singing contest, singing her winning piece "You and the Night and the Music." After that, she won in another radio singing contest, The Liberty Big Show. She entered the national singing contest, Tawag ng Tanghalan, was defeated on her first try, but became a champion on her second attempt. The Grand National Finals of Tawag ng Tanghalan was on May 29, 1967, where she sang "Moonlight Becomes You."

Aunor went to Mabini Memorial College (1959 to 1960) when she was in the first grade and transferred to Nichols Air Base Elementary School (1960 to 1962) when she reached the second grade. She finished high school at Generosa de Leon Memorial College in Paranaque, a branch of Centro Escolar University.

Marriage and later life
Aunor and actor Christopher de Leon tied the knot on January 25, 1975, in a civil ceremony. She and De León have one biological child: actor Ian de León (born 1975) and four adopted children Lotlot De Leon Matet de Leon, Kiko and Kenneth. She and her husband renewed their vows on January 27, 1976, in a religious service officiated by Rev Alleysius Rodríguez. The couple later separated, and their marriage was dissolved in 1996.

Aunor became a permanent resident of the United States in 2008, but retains her Filipino citizenship. In 2011, she came back to the Philippines to resume her acting and singing career after an 8-year hiatus.

Career

1960s

After winning the local talent search, Tawag ng Tanghalan in 1967, she made her first appearance as a guest at Timi Yuro's Araneta Coliseum concert. She made her first TV appearance as a guest in An Evening with Pilita hosted by Pilita Corrales and Carmen on Camera hosted by Carmen Soriano.

On October 2, 1967, Aunor signed an eight-picture non-exclusive contract with Sampaguita Pictures, with the assurance that she would be given a singing part. Aunor made several youth-oriented films like All Over World and Way Out of the Country.

From September to December 1967 Aunor had supporting and minor roles in six films. Meanwhile, she made several singles like "Moonlight Becomes You" and "There's Just Forever" for Citation Records, and "No Return, No Exchange" and "You are My First Love" for Jasper Recording.  1968 was a less busy time; she only had minor roles in three films, mostly for musical numbers.

By the beginning of 1969, she appeared in such movies as 9 Teeners, a popular TV show that time, and Young Girl, where she was teamed up for the first time with Tirso Cruz III. That year her contract with Sampaguita Pictures expired and she made movies with other studios, including Banda 24 and Drakulita for Barangay, Oh Delilah, Karate Showdown, Pabandying-Bandying and Adriana.

Tower Records gave Aunor her first starring role opposite Tirso Cruz III, the "D' Musical Teenage Idols" by Tower Productions, directed by Artemio Marquez, was shown on September 23, 1969. Three days after, on September 26, 1969, Sampaguita Pictures released its 34th-anniversary presentation, Fiesta Extravaganza.

Superstar holds the record as the longest-running musical variety show on Philippine prime-time TV. On December 19, 1969, during the coronation of Nora as muse of Sampaguita Family Club, Tirso gave her a doll "Maria Leonora Theresa", which reportedly became the most popular doll in Philippine showbiz history.

1970s
Aunor continued to make teeny-bopper movies alongside Tirso Cruz III. They are known as Guy and Pip to their fans.  Their biggest film, Guy and Pip, stayed in the cinemas for six months, had an unprecedented record-breaking box-office gross, and was seen by more than 4 million Filipinos. Adjusted for ticket-price inflation, Guy and Pip's P8-million gross in 1971 is equivalent to P560-million at 2009 average ticket prices.

On April 2, 1970, 17-year-old Aunor signed an exclusive contract with Tower Records and was sued by Sampaguita Pictures for Breach of Contract. Nora eventually graduated from being a teen idol to dramatic actress she received her first Best Actress award in 1972 for her film And God Smiled at Me from Quezon City Film Festival. She was first nominated as a best actress in FAMAS (Filipino Academy for Movies, Arts and Sciences) for A Gift of Love. From 1972 to 1986 she was nominated consecutively for Best Actress by the FAMAS, the only actor or actress to ever achieve the feat. During this time, she also released several albums.

In 1973, Aunor established her own movie production company, "NV Productions" and produced its first movie entitled Carmela. She was again nominated in the 22nd FAMAS Awards for Paru-parung Itim (The Black Mariposa). She made Fe, Esperanza, Caridad (1974) another critically acclaimed movie which was directed by three different directors namely Cirio H. Santiago and two National Artists for film; Gerardo de Leon and Lamberto V. Avellana. This movie earned Nora her third nomination from the 23rd FAMAS Awards.

She also produced and starred in the movie Banaue: Stairway to the Sky (1975) which was directed by national artist Gerardo de Leon. This is a story about the tribe of Ifugao and their struggles to achieve the promised land. Aunor received her fourth nomination from FAMAS Awards. Her co-star, fast-rising actor Christopher de Leon, later became her husband the father of her only son, Ian Kristoffer De Leon.

In 1976, Aunor produced the movie Alkitrang Dugo (Blood of Tar) through her own movie production company, NV Productions.  This movie was based on the novel Lord of the Flies by the Nobel Prize-winning English author Sir William Golding.

Aunor continued making critically acclaimed movies like the period drama Tatlong Taong Walang Diyos (Three Years Without God). She played the role of a school Teacher, named Rosario, who experienced the atrocities of World War II. Her very convincing performance made her win the first ever best actress award from the Manunuri ng Pelikulang Pilipino (Gawad Urian Award) and her first Best Actress Award from FAMAS. it was also considered by many as one of the greatest Filipino movies of all time. The double victory is considered by many as the first acting grand slam since there were only two award giving bodies for movies at that time. Before the year ended, Aunor made Minsa'y Isang Gamu-gamo (Once There Was a Firefly) (1976). This is the story of Corazon de la Cruz, a nurse who wanted to go to America to give a better future for her family, but her brother was shot by an American soldier on the eve of her flight to America. Knowing that the administration of President Ferdinand Marcos would not allow the public showing of any films criticizing the American existence in the Philippines, the producers tapped Aunor to star in the film believing that the superstar had connections with the president and his wife, former First Lady, Imelda Marcos. This film was the official entry of Premiere Productions to the 1976 Metro Manila Film Festival.

In 1977, Aunor had a chance to do a romantic-comedy movie with the king of the Philippine movie Fernando Poe Jr. The title of the movie is Little Christmas Tree. The film was shown on November 25, 1977, and it was a blockbuster hit. This is the only collaboration between the two of the biggest stars of the Philippine movies. On December 25, 1977, her movie "Bakya Mo, Neneng" (Your Wooden Clogs, Neneng) was the official entry of JE Productions to the 1977 Metro Manila Film Festival. She was paired to then movie actor and former Philippine President Joseph Estrada.

In 1978 FAMAS Awards, Aunor received another nomination for her movie Bakya Mo Neneng, this is her six straight nomination from the academy. However, she failed to win an award but the movie won Best Picture. She also did a movie, Ikaw ay Akin (You are Mine), with Vilma Santos and Christopher de Leon. This film gave Aunor her second nomination as best actress from Gawad Urian.

Later that year, her movie Atsay (Maid) was the official entry to the 1978 Metro Manila Film Festival. It is one of the two best entries of the film festival along with Rubia Servios directed by Lino Brocka. Atsay was the only film to have won the Best Performer in the Metro Manila Film Festival history. In that year, the organizers decided to give just one citation for performers (no best actor nor actress nor supporting actor nor actress award) but only the Best Performer Award.

Aunor was awarded the Best Performer award for her performance in this movie. Amy Austria who played a supporting role in this movie was a nominee for the Best Performer award. The film festival organizers wanted to have a gender sensitivity by stopping such sexist award. The move, however, was scrapped the following year. Atsay also received the Best Picture Award, Romeo Vitug for Best Cinematography and Eddie Garcia for Best Director. Aunor was nominated for the seventh time at the 27th FAMAS Awards.

Before the end of the decade, she made two more movies for the 1979 Metro Manila Film Festival, Kasal-Kasalan, Bahay-Bahayan and Ina ka ng Anak Mo. Both lead actresses, Nora Aunor and veteran actress Lolita Rodriguez, were recognized as Best Actresses at the film fest award's night for the film Ina ka ng Anak Mo. The same film won best director for Brocka, Best Actor for Raoul Aragon and Best Picture. Aunor was also nominated and won at the 28th FAMAS Awards for her role. This was Aunor's second FAMAS Best Actress Award.

1980s

In the 1980s Aunor continued to do quality films as well as commercial movies. Her first movie in the decade was Nakaw na Pag-ibig (Stolen Love), another collaboration of Aunor and the National Artist for film Lino Brocka together with Hilda Koronel and Phillip Salvador, both of whom were Brocka protégés. However, the movie didn't do well in the box office. That same year, Aunor made a movie with Mario O'Hara after so many years. They made Kastilyong Buhangin(Sandcastle) with now Senator Lito Lapid as her screen leading man. The movie turned out to be monster hit. Before 1980 ended, two of Aunor's film were part of the 1980 Metro Manila Film Festival as official entries. Kung Akoy Iiwan Mo, directed by Laurice Guillen with Christopher de Leon and Roly Quizon. She played the role of Beatrice Alcala, a singing superstar, and how she showed her complex emotion through singing. The film won Best Sound Engineering and Best Cinematography. The other entry was Bona, a film by Lino Brocka. During the 1980 MMFF, there were three nominees for Best Actress: Aunor for Bona, Aunor for Kung Akoý Iiwan Mo (If You Leave Me), and eventual winner Amy Austria for Brutal. Aunor won her second Gawad Urian Best Actress for Bona, tying her with Gina Alajar, who won for Brutal; Aunor 
won her ninth Best Actress nomination from the 29th FAMAS Awards for the same movie. The film was also shown at the 1981 Cannes International Film Festival as an entry to the Director's Fortnight. In September 1982, the film competed at Figueira da Foz International Film Festival in Portugal and won the Premio de le Juri de la Federacion Internationale des Cine Clubs (Jury Prize of the International Federation of Cinema Clubs).  It was the only Filipino Film cited as one of "The Best 100 Films in the World" by the Museum of Tolerance in Los Angeles, USA (1997). It is the only Filipino film to be archived at The Museum of Modern Art (MoMA) in New York.

In 1981, Aunor made six movies most of them are romantic-comedy like the blockbusters Totoo Ba ang Tsismis with Gabby Concepcion, Ibalik ang Swerti, with the ReyCards Duet, Dalaga si Mister, Binata si Misis with Christopher de Leon, and Rock N Roll, which was the official entry to the 1981 Metro Manila Film Festival. This film was also one of the top grosser of the said film fest. Aunor made only one serious drama that year, Bakit Bughaw ang Langit? (Why the Sky is Blue?). Aunor received her 10th FAMAS Best Actress nomination and 5th nomination from Gawad Urian for her performance in this film. She won best actress from the Catholic Mass Media Awards. Unfortunately, no print of this film is known to officially exist.

Aunor continued to make romantic comedy films in 1982, such as Annie Sabungera with Ace Vergel, Palengke Queen with Matt Ranillo III. In the same year, Aunor starred in films that drew acclaim for her performances. The first one is Mga Uod at Rosas (Worms and Roses), a story of a struggling artist who is frustrated with life and has been entertaining the thought of giving up his art. Aunor played Socorro, a landlady daughter who falls for the painter who is in love with a model. The art of painting plays a central and integrative role in this film. This film gave Aunor her 11th nomination from FAMAS. The other one is in T-Bird at Ako (T-Bird and Me), Aunor essayed the role of a lesbian who falls for a woman. Aunor in Himala (Miracle) played the role of a young woman, who claimed to have seen the Virgin Mary. The film became the first Filipino film to be included in the "Competition Section" of the prestigious Berlin International Film Festival and received many international awards like Bronze Hugo Awards, 19th Chicago Film Festival (1983) (winner), Asia-Pacific Film Festival Special Achievement for Best Depiction of Socially Involved Religion (1983), and Best Asian-Pacific Movie of All Time, CNN APSA Viewers Choice Award (2008)

In 1984, Aunor only made three films. She portrayed an Overseas Filipino Worker (OFW) who works as a nurse in America and her struggles to fight loneliness and homesickness in 'Merika. The film also tackles the story of Filipino illegal aliens who will do anything just to get a Green card. Directed by Gil Portes, Aunor's performance in this film gave her the very first best actress trophy from, (PMPC) Star Awards for Movies and her eighth Gawad Urian best actress nomination. The next film was given an "A" Rating by the Film Ratings Board, Condemned is a story of siblings Yolly (Aunor) and Efren (Dan Alvaro), and how their lives changed when Efren worked as a driver and a hired killer for ruthless money laundering lady Connie played by (Gloria Romero).  The best scene of the film is the final confrontation between Yolly and Connie over the missing half million dollars makes for a gripping film-noir drama.  The third and the last of this 1984 Nora Aunor Classic is Bulaklak sa City Jail (Flowers of the City Jail), the film depicts the bad and sad situation of women in the City Jail and the only way to survive this gruesome situation is to turn yourself from the hunted to a hunter. The film was an official entry to the 1984 Metro Manila Film Festival, for her role as a pregnant prisoner and a victim of injustice, Angela Aguilar, Aunor won best actress from Metro Manila Film Festival, Catholic Mass Media Awards and her third best actress trophy from FAMAS. At the Gawad Urian that year, Aunor was a double nominee for Best Actress for the films Bulaklak sa City Jail and Merika, the first actor to achieve such. She was also nominated for Best Actress at the Film Academy of the Philippines for Bulaklak sa Ciy Jail.

In 1985, Aunor made five films. The first was Beloved, where Aunor reunited with Christopher de Leon together with Hilda Koronel and Dindo Fernando. The film is about four people who are torn between the love of power and the power of love and infidelity. The film was also serialized in King Komiks. Next was Tinik sa Dibdib as Lorna, a long-suffering daughter of irresponsible parents who drove her to marry a security guard, who himself is the breadwinner of a very dysfunctional family. Her next project was Till We Meet Again. This was followed by an anthology film Mga Kwento ni Lola Basyang, which was even stronger at the box-office, and finally, I Can't Stop Loving You, an entry to the year-end Metro Manila Film Festival, which was a top-grosser for that year.

For the next three years, she slowed down in making films releasing only a handful including her final team-up with Dolphy, My Bugoy Goes to Congress, which was a hit during the time that it was released. Other films she made were I Love You Mama, I Love You Papa, in which she co-starred with her estranged husband, Christopher de Leon and their children, Lotlot and Ian Kristoffer; Sana Mahalin Mo Ako; Tatlong Ina, Isang Anak (Three Mothers, One Son); and Balut...Penoy.

1989 was a bittersweet year for Aunor. She filmed Bilangin ang mga Bituin sa Langit (Count the Stars in the Sky), about the rise and fall of a poor, hard-working, and determined barrio lass and her lifetime stormy relationship with a childhood sweetheart. Bilangin ang Bituin sa Langit is a film for which Aunor won Best Actress in Gawad Urian, FAMAS, and FAP. On the other hand, her longtime musical-variety show Superstar was cancelled on October 1, 1989. They tried to revive the show when then transferred to Channel 13 on November 25, 1989, but it didn't last long.

1990s

In the 1990s Aunor only made 10 films, a far cry from earlier decades where she made up to 10 movies a year. Showbiz insiders and others were saying that Aunor's popularity was waning.  But most of these 10 movies were critically acclaimed and won not only local but international awards. Aunor also did three stages plays, the first two produced by Philippine Educational Theater Association (PETA), and performed her first major concert. 

In the first of these films Aunor portrayed an activist who went to the mountains to search for her husband who has been killed by the military. In the 1990 film Andrea, Paano Ba ang Maging Isang Ina?, Aunor plays a NPA rebel who leaves her newborn baby to search for her husband. The film won for Aunor all the Best Actress Awards given by the Philippines' five annual award-giving bodies at that time: Gawad Urian, Star Awards for Movies, Film Academy of the Philippines, and her fifth FAMAS Award for Best Actress, thus elevating her to the Hall of Fame. She won the first Young Critics Circle Award for Best Performance. The film was also the official entry to the 1990 Metro Manila Film Festival and she also won the Best Actress award.

On May 18, 1991, few days before her 38th birthday, she staged her first major concert at the Araneta Coliseum, thus earning the name "concert queen" for filling the big dome with about 30,000 eager fans. Her guests included Gary Valenciano, Mon Faustino, The Hotlegs, The Operas, and many more. Many showbiz personalities came to show their support to Aunor like Sharon Cuneta, Joseph Estrada, Regine Velasquez, Pilita Corrales, Danny Tan, Edgar Mortiz, Juan Rodrigo, Carlo Orosa, Ivy Violan, and others. Later that year, Aunor ventured into the world of theater and showed versatility and genius when she did the stage adaptation of her critically acclaimed film, Minsa'y Isang Gamu-gamo. It was staged by the Philippine Educational Theater Association (PETA) and helmed by Socrates "Soxy" Topacio, then PETA's artistic head. Rody Vera penned the stage adaptation of Gamu-Gamo. She did two more stage plays, DH in 1992 and The Trojan Women in 1994.

On December 25, 1991, Ang Totoong Buhay ni Pacita M. was part of the 1991 Metro Manila Film Festival. The film tells the story of Pacita M., a singer-entertainer in a seedy Quezon City nightclub whose daughter Grace was shot in the head by a stray bullet just as she was preparing to go off to college. Although initially, Pacita held out for a miracle to save her daughter from her vegetative state, eventually she relents and seeks to allow Grace a dignified death by turning off her respirator. The emotional battle becomes a personal epiphany for Pacita. This highly acclaimed film directed by Elwood Perez bravely tackles the sensitive issue of euthanasia. Aunor won numerous awards for her performance, including the Metro Manila Film Festival Best Actress, her fourth Gawad Urian, and her third consecutive Best Actress trophy from the Film Academy of the Philippines. She won from Star Awards and from the Young Critics Circle Award for Best Performance.

In 1992, Aunor was busy with her stage play, DH, a PETA production. PETA toured the play in North America, Europe, and Hong Kong. On the same year, Aunor returned to television via a once a week drama anthology, Star Drama Presents NORA. She won the Best Actress Award from Star Awards for Television (Philippine Movie Press Club). In 1994, she won the Best Actress in a Single Performance award from Star Awards for Television (Philippine Movie Press Club)for her performance i "Spotlight" for the episode: "Good Morning, Ma'am". She went back into the recording studio to record bonus tracks for a compilation album to be released in co-operation with Alpha Records and Warner Brothers. The new songs were written by an American songwriter, a neighbor of her sister Tita in San Diego, California. The songs were released as a single but sales suffered after a rumor circulated that Aunor had gotten an abortion while she was in San Diego. The song hit number 12 on the charts after two weeks and dropped off completely on its third week.

In 1994, Aunor received the Lifetime Achievement Award from the Film Academy of the Philippines. She is the youngest recipient of this special award. In 1995, Aunor found success in the box office when she starred in the biographical film The Flor Contemplacion Story, about Filipino domestic worker Flor Contemplacion who was hanged in Singapore for allegedly killing her fellow maid. Her performance in The Flor Contemplacion Story got rave reviews earning her first international best actress awards from Cairo International Film Festival, she swept all the Best-Actress awards given by the Philippines' different award-giving bodies, including the Best Performance by Male or Female, Adult or Child, and Individual or Ensemble in Leading or Supporting Role given by the Young Critics Circle Award for Best Performance.

Aunor's other 1995 film was Viva Films' official entry to the 1995 Metro Manila Film Festival. Muling Umawit ang Puso is a story of a once-famous actress now struggling to regain her popularity but fails. Winner of 8 awards at the 1995 Metro Manila Film Festival including Best Picture, director, actress, Supporting Actor and Supporting Actress.

In June 1996, Aunor was cast to play Sisa in Premiere Productions' then-upcoming film adaptation of José Rizal's novel Noli Me Tángere, though the project did not come to fruition. In 1997, Aunor won her second international Best-Actress trophy from 1st East Asia Film and Television Award for her role as a psychotic woman and how she plans her revenge on the family of her parents' killer in Bakit May Kahapon Pa?.

In 1999, Aunor made only one film, Sidhi, written by Rolando Tinio, a National Artist for Theater and Literature. Later that same year Aunor received the Centennial Honor for the Arts conferred by the Cultural Center of the Philippines.

2000s
In 2002, Aunor returned to Philippine television through her nightly drama show entitled, Bituin, a Filipino soap opera that was aired by ABS-CBN from September 23, 2002, to May 23, 2003. It starred Carol Banawa and Desiree del Valle, Aunor and Cherie Gil. The show is very consistent as one of the top rating shows of ABS-CBN, its highest rating was 48.7% for the "Ultimate Showdown: The Diva VS The Supernova" of Melody and Bernadette at the Araneta Coliseum, while the lowest was 29.5%, its fifth episode. Bituin was shown in different countries including Malaysia, Ghana and Cambodia.

In 2004, Aunor made her last film shot entirely in the Philippines before she went on hiatus for almost 8 years. Naglalayag tells the story of a May–December affair between a middle-aged judge and a young taxi driver. It sparkles because of superb acting by Aunor and Yul Servo. Aunor portrayed a judge who recently presided over a well publicized criminal case trial. Her character Dorinda is a 50-year-old widow with a twenty-something-year-old son, Yul Servo played Noah Garcia, a courteous and charming taxi driver who keeps a rosary in his pocket and shares stories from the Bible. Stranded with a non-operational taxi, the 23-year-old novice driver Noah offers shelter to his passenger. The performances by Aunor and Servo gave them their international acting awards at the 31st Festival International du Film Indépendant de Bruxelles and the film won the jury prize, they also received local recognition.

On December 1, 2005, Aunor received her own star on the Philippines Walk of Fame. She was one of the first inductees. This project was spearheaded by German Moreno. For the first time since she was inducted, Aunor visited her star on August 7, 2011, she even laid down to her star as the TV cameras documented the event.

While in the United States, Aunor did two independently produced films namely Ingrata and Care Home. Even with only some limited run in few Metro Manila theaters, the films, particularly Care Home, was still able to score for Aunor critical praise and even nominations for Best Actress, specially from PMPC STAR Awards for Movies in 2007.

2010s

At the start of the decade, she was still doing series of concert in the United States and Canada performing to Filipino communities and to her fans as well. In February 2010, Aunor was shortlisted by the Green Globe Film Awards which was later renamed to Green Planet Movie Awards as one of the 10 Best Asian Actresses of the Decade. On March 23, 2010, Aunor was named one of the 10 Best Asian Actresses along with Gong Li and Maggie Cheung. She is the only Filipino actress to be shortlisted and won this award.

Aunor underwent plastic surgery as part of her plan to return to show business. The legendary actress has been absent for years, and 2010 may be Nora's comeback year. She jumpstarted her career via two endorsement deals in Japan and one of them as an endorser of a Japanese Aesthetic and Lasix Center. However, something went wrong, Aunor lost her "Golden Voice" which propelled her to superstardom in the Philippine Showbiz Industry. During her concert in May 2010 in Toronto, Ontario, Canada, Aunor tearfully announced that it would be her last concert as she could no longer sing. Her voice was hoarse and raspy.

As early as December 2010, news of Aunor's comeback to the Philippines was all over the news in both TV and broadsheets but there were no formal confirmations yet. Finally on August 2, 2011, Tuesday, Nora finally came back to the Philippines via Philippine Airlines flight 103.

On her return, Aunor signed a 3-year contract with TV5, she did a mini series, Sa Ngalan ng Ina, and a historical film with Governor ER Ejercito entitled El Presidente, a biopic of the first Philippine President Emilio Aguinaldo intended for 2012 Metro Manila Film Festival, in which she played the role of Aguinaldo's second wife Maria Agoncillo. Also in 2011, she received eight Lifetime Achievement Awards for film and music from different award giving bodies.

Sa Ngalan ng Ina was the first project of Aunor after her return, she starred with Christopher de Leon and Bembol Roco. It was also the last directorial job of the late Mario O'Hara. Sa Ngalan ng Ina is a film made for television or a miniseries is a political drama about a widow that ran as a governor when her husband was assassinated. In his review, film critic Noel Vera point out that the show is rare creature in Philippine television, the political melodrama. Longer and more complex soap operas have been mounted on Philippine television before, and politics has been touched upon before, but far as I can recall there has never been a series (the exact name of the genre is, I believe, the teleserye) fully driven by politics, hinging upon the election into office and subsequent administration of the main character. All of the performances were great especially Aunor which gave her a nomination from Golden Screen TV Awards and a best actress trophy from 2012 Star Awards for Television. This miniseries would be the last collaboration between Aunor and O'hara before his death from leukemia.

In 2012, Aunor collaborated with the Cannes best director awardee Brillante Mendoza for the film Thy Womb which was part of the 69th Venice International Film Festival. In the film, Aunor plays Shaleha, a barren Badjao midwife who helps her husband look for a wife who can bear a child. The film was nominated for Golden Lion for Best Film and Volpi Cup for best actress for Aunor. On the eve of Venice awards rites, Aunor was chosen by an independent film critics, the "Premio Della Critica Indipendiente" as their best performer and gave her the Bisato d’Oro.

In November 2012, Aunor won the Best Actress Award from 6th Asia Pacific Screen Award and Best director for the same film. By virtue of her nomination from Asia Pacific Screen Award, she became the first Filipino actor to be inducted as a member of Asia Pacific Screen Academy. She was also nominated at the 55th Asia Pacific Film Festival, Dubai International Film Festival, 43rd International Film Festival of India, and won Best Actress at the 7th Asian Film Awards.

At the 2012 Metro Manila Film Festival, Aunor won her eighth best actress award.

Also in 2012, Aunor guested in Enchanted Garden a fantasy-drama TV series. She played the role of Nana Sela a faith healer who happens to be Queen Oleya. She guested in Third Eye. In 2013, she returned to TV via her new soap opera, Never Say Goodbye. In 2013, she finished Ang Kwento ni Mabuti an official entry to the 1st CineFilipino film Festival directed by acclaimed director Mes de Guzman. The film is a morality tale set in rural Nueva Vizcaya. In the film, Aunor spoke Ilocano, the language of that area.

On May 21, 2013, Aunor celebrated her 60th birthday dubbed as "Nora at 60" at the Meralco Multi-Purpose Hall. The venue was transformed into a virtual museum as posters of her classic films adorned the lobby and the hallway leading to the ballroom.

On June 18, 2013, Aunor won the Gawad Urian Best Actress Award for the movie Thy Womb. This was her 17th nomination and her 7th win.

On August 30, 2013, Aunor won her 4th international Best Actress award from the 3rd Sakhalin International Film Festival in Russia for the movie Thy Womb.  Aunor wasn't able to attend the awarding ceremony but the award was received on her behalf by her director Brillante Mendoza who attended the Festival together with his writer Henry Burgos.

2014 is the busiest year for Aunor after she came back from her hiatus. She started the year by filming her second tele-movie/miniseries with TV5 entitled  When I Fall in Love, The miniseries was directed by Joel Lamangan. Aunor portrays Fely, a devoted wife, who takes care of Armando (Tirso Cruz III), the husband who has pancreatic cancer. The made-for-TV movie had its premiere showing in January 2014 and was seen on TV in February 2014.

Aunor was honored as one of the "People of the Year" by People Asia magazine on January 21, 2014. In the promotional news of TV5, Aunor was announced to top-bill a TV5's musical-drama, Trenderas, which tells the tale of how three musically gifted young ladies rise from being sidewalk vendors to YouTube-famous singers.  Aunor will play the role of Celina Palomar, a famous singer who mysteriously disappeared at the height of her popularity. After years of living a life of a recluse, music finds Celina again through three young, talented, and hopeful singers.

On February 2, 2014, Aunor received her second Ani ng Dangal]Award from the National Commission for Culture and the Arts (Philippines) or NCCA. The Ani ng Dangal (Harvest of Honors) Awards recognizes artists who have earned international awards and accolades during the past year.  in 2013, Aunor won 2 international Best Actress award from the 7th Asian Film Awards in Hong Kong and 3rd Sakhalin International Film Festival in Russia.

On July 18, 2014, the University of the Philippines College of Mass Communication announced that for the year 2014, the recipient of Gawad Plaridel is Nora Aunor for Television, Music and Film.

Aunor made four films in 2014 and one of them was Hustisya, which is part of the 10th Cinemalaya Independent Film Festival. This is the first time that Aunor participated in the said Film festival. Hustisya is a story of a woman who works for a human trafficking agency controlled by a powerful syndicate. The movie was directed by the director Joel Lamangan and was penned by Ricky Lee. On August 10, 2014, during the awards night of the Cinemalays Independent Film Festival, Aunor won her first Best Actress award, she was so thankful for the award and promised to continue making meaningful movies and her movies will be an inspiration to the youth. The movie, was also declared by the Filmfest organizers as the box-office winner during its weeklong run.

Before the middle of the year, Aunor has finished three other movies aside from Hustisya. One is a psychological horror drama entitled Dementia directed by newcomer director Perci Intalan. The other two movies, Padre de Pamilya and Whistleblower, were both directed by Adolfo Alix, Jr. On August 27, 2014, University of the Philippines College of Mass Communication conferred to her the Gawad Plaridel for her excellence in film and television. Gawad plaridel is the sole award in the University of the Philippines System given to outstanding media practitioners. Aunor gave a speech about how she became a singer, an actress, and eventually a movie producer

In 2012, Aunor received the Asian Achiever Award as Asia's Best Actress Awardee by the Asia Pacific Awards Council (APAC) led by noted Filipino consumers advocate Jonathan Navea. She will again receive the same prestigious accolade during the 26th Asia Pacific Excellence Awards on Araw ng Kagitingan on April 9, 2015, to be held at the AFP Theater commemorating the SAF 44 Heroes Tribute organized by the same organization together with Japanese performing artist Aisaku Yokogawa. On March 17, 2015, Nora publicly called for President Noynoy Aquino's resignation.

On May 16, 2015, Aunor won her eight International Best actress for her film Dementia, that also won the Best Foreign Language Film at the St. Tropez International Film Festival in France. Aunor wasn't there to personally receive her award but it was accepted by its director Perci Intalan who was elated for the recognition.

In 2015, Aunor received several recognition from the different Universities and colleges, naming her as a cultural Icon. Bicol University gaver her a very special recognition, she was presented with the ONRA Award upon the initiative of Ako Bicol Partylist Rep. Rodel M. Batocabe for bringing honor and pride to her fellow Bicolanos in particular, and to the country in general, through her achievements in the arts. The next School that presented her with a recognition is the Ateneo de Naga University which gave her "Bulawan na Bikolnon" award for giving pride to the Bicol Region. De La Salle University was the next University to hand her a recognition. Aunor was conferred the "Gawada La Sallian para sa Sining" for her contributions to Philippine Arts. National Teachers College and Far Eastern University also gave their recognition to Nora Aunor.

On September 17, 2015, Aunor was conferred the Gawad CPP para sa Sining for Film and Broadcast Arts that was given by the Cultural Center of the Philippines.  The Gawad CCP Para sa Sining is the highest award given by the CCP. The award was also conferred on Denisa Reyes for Dance; Fides Cuyugan Asensio for Music; Antonio Mabesa for Theater; Roberto Chabet for Visual Arts; Ricardo Lee for Literature; Paulo Alcazaren for Architecture; Ben Farrales for Design; Leoncio Deriada, Talaandig School of Living Traditions, Armida Siguion-Reyna, and Basilio Esteban Villaruz. The Missionary Society of St. Columban received the Tanging Parangal. In her speech, Aunor said the becoming an actress was a worthwhile decision, despite the heartaches.

At the 63rd FAMAS Awards on September 20, 2015, Aunor together with other movie queens was recognized as the Iconic Movie Queen of Philippine Cinema.

After the death of German Moreno, Aunor said she is ready to continue Moreno's late night variety-talk show Walang Tulugan. However, the show aired its final episode on February 13, 2016.

Legacy
In 1983, Aunor was recognized as one of The Outstanding Women in the Nation's Service (TOWNS) in the Field of the Arts. In 1999, Aunor received the Centennial Honors for the Arts awarded by the Cultural Center of the Philippines (CCP). She was the only film actress included in the list of awardees. In 2010, she was hailed by the Green Planet Movie Awards as one of the "10 Asian Best Actresses of the Decade". She received the Ani ng Dangal Award (Harvest of Honors). from the National Commission for Culture and the Arts in 2013, 2014 and 2016.  In 2013, she received the "Light of Culture Awards from Philippine Centre of the International Theatre Institute and the ITI-Earthsavers UNESCO Dream Center for pioneering in the integration of theater, television, and film. In 2014, Aunor is the recipient of University of the Philippines College of Mass Communications, Gawad Plaridel Award. On September 17, 2015, Aunor was conferred the Gawad CCP para sa Sining for Film and Broadcast Arts, the highest award given by the Cultural Center of the Philippines. She was also conferred of the Gusi Peace Prize in 2015.

In 2022, Aunor was conferred The Order of National Artists of the Philippines for Film and Broadcasting/Broadcast Arts.

Multimedia superstar

Cinema

Since the late 1960s up to the present, Aunor has made more than 180 films in different genres, from Musicals, Comedy, romantic comedy, Romance and Love story. Later on, she made films in other genres such as drama, biographical, film noir, action, thriller, horror and art films.

She has received numerous national and international awards and nominations. She is the first Filipino actress to win an International acting award in a major Film Festival (Cairo 1995 for the movie The Flor Contemplacion Story). She has been directed by four Philippine National Artist Awardees: Gerardo de Leon (Fe, Esperanza, Caridad and Banaue: Stairway to the Sky), Lamberto Avellana (Fe, Esperanza, Caridad), Lino Brocka (Ina ka ng Anak Mo, Nakaw na pag-ibig, Bona), and Ishmael Bernal (Himala).

Music

Aunor has released more than 360 singles and recorded more than 200 songs and over 50 albums. She has notched more than 30 gold singles and with an estimated gross sales of one million units, Nora's cover of "Pearly Shells" (1971) is one of the biggest-selling singles in the Philippines.
Due to a botched cosmetic surgery in Japan while endorsing a cosmetic surgery clinic based in Shinigawa and Makati, her vocal chords were damaged and she cannot sing due to paralysis of her left vocal chords.

Television
Aunor started her career in television when she was given her own musical show via Nora-Eddie Show, with the late singer and former Tawag ng Tanghalan Champion Eddie Peregrina. The show later became, The Nora Aunor Show and eventually was re-titled Superstar.

Radio
Aunor was heard and guested in Fiesta Extravaganza and in the long running afternoon radio program of German Moreno (The Germiside Show where he had a Guy and Pip portion) and only songs of Nora Aunor and Tirso Cruz were played over and over again from 2 to 3 pm every Sunday aired via DZMM.

Stage
Aunor has performed in three plays: Minsa'y Isang Gamu-Gamo (1991), DH (Domestic Helper) in 1992, and The Trojan Women (1994). The first two were staged by the Philippine Educational Theater Association (PETA) and helmed by Socrates Topacio, then PETA's artistic head. Rody Vera penned the stage adaptation of Gamu-Gamo while renowned screenwriter Ricky Lee created DH. PETA toured both plays in North America, Europe, and Hong Kong. The third play, a Filipino adaptation of Euripides’ immortal tragedy, was produced by Cecille Guidote-Alvarez's theater company, directed by a Greek national, and staged at the Ninoy Aquino Parks and Wildlife.

Product endorsement
At the peak of her career, Aunor was the top product endorser for television, print, and radio advertisements. The sales of Dial bath soap, for instance, shot up after Aunor endorsed it. Originally imported from the US, Dial soap first catered the AB bracket. When it was eventually manufactured locally, it courted the CD market by making Aunor its product endorser. Aunor appeared in a television commercial of Dial soap taking a shower and singing, "Aren't you glad you used Dial?". The television commercial proved successful as sales of Dial soap went up, and the masses, which comprise the bulk of her fans, patronized Dial soap.

Aunor has endorsed many local and international brands.

Awards and nominations

Aunor has been awarded, recognized and received multiple nominations from different organizations, academe, institutions, critics and award giving bodies for her work in film, television, music and theater. She is the most nominated actress for the leading role in the long history of FAMAS Awards, having nominated 17 times since 1973 when she was first nominated for A Gift of Love but only second to Eddie Garcia with 23 nominations both in leading and supporting role.

With her fifth FAMAS Award for Best Actress in 1991, Aunor became the sixth performer to be elevated to the FAMAS Hall of Fame joining the likes of Eddie Garcia, Joseph Estrada, Charito Solis, Fernando Poe Jr. and Vilma Santos. This award is given to the person who won more than five times in its particular category. She is also the only performer in the long history of FAMAS Awards to be nominated for fifteen (15) straight years from 1973 to 1987.

Aunor has more international best actress awards and nominations more than any other Filipino actor.  She is the only Filipino actress who have won international awards from 5 different continents. 19th Cairo International Film Festival in 1995 (Africa), 1st East Asia Film and Television Award in 1997 and Asian Film Awards in 2013 (Asia), 31st Festival International du Film Indépendant de Bruxelles in 2004 and Premio Della Critica Indipendiente in 2013 (Europe), Asia Pacific Screen Award in 2013 (Australia) and from the Green Planet Movie Award (North America). She has the most Lifetime Achievement Awards received locally and internationally for her contribution in film, television, music, and theater.

Notable citations as a recording artist
In 1968, Nora Aunor was contracted by Alpha Records upon the recommendation of singer Carmen Soriano.  Although Aunor's first singles were not major hits, she subsequently went on to smash local record sales with songs like "It's Time to Say Goodbye", "Silently", "Forever Loving You", "It's Not Unusual", and countless others. In her seven years with Alpha Records, Aunor was able to set all-time high record sales which up to this day has not been surpassed.
At the height of her popularity as a recording artist in the late 1960s and early 1970s, local records soared up to 60% of national sales according to Alpha Records Philippines.

She is the artist with the most singles in Philippine recording history (with more than 260 singles). Over-all she has recorded more than 500 songs. She has notched more than 30 gold singles, a record in the local music industry. With estimated sales of one million units, Nora's cover of "Pearly Shells" (1971) is one of the biggest-selling singles in the Philippines ever. She has recorded some 46 hit long-playing albums, and several extended plays.
 At the height of her popularity as a recording artist in the late 1960s and early 1970s, sales of local records soared up to 60% of national sales according to Alpha Records Philippines.
 She is the artist with the most singles in Philippine recording history (with more than 260 singles). Overall she has recorded more than 500 songs.
 She has notched more than 30 gold singles.
 With estimated sales of one million units, Nora's cover of "Pearly Shells" (1971) is one of the biggest-selling singles in the Philippines.

Discography

Selected filmography

See also
 List of awards and nominations received by Nora Aunor

References

External links

 The Artistry of Nora Aunor
 
 

 
1953 births
Living people
People from Iriga
Filipino child actresses
Actresses from Manila
Filipino film actresses
Filipino television actresses
Filipino television personalities
20th-century Filipino musicians
Filipino women pop singers
Contraltos
Filipino expatriates in the United States
Filipino women comedians
Actresses from Camarines Sur
Singers from Camarines Sur
Bicolano actors
20th-century Filipino actresses
21st-century Filipino actresses
Best Actress Asian Film Award winners
Asia Pacific Screen Award winners
ABS-CBN personalities
GMA Network personalities
TV5 (Philippine TV network) personalities